The 1994 Oregon gubernatorial election took place on November 3, 1994. Democratic nominee John Kitzhaber won the election, defeating Republican Denny Smith.

Polling

Results
Official results are as follows:

References

1994
Oregon
Gubernatorial